Dejan Račić (born 15 July 1998) is a Montenegrin football forward who plays for OFK Grbalj. He also holds the Serbian passport.

Career

Voždovac
Born in Berane, Račić started playing football with local club with the same name. Later was with OFK Beograd, before he joined Voždovac. Shortly after he was called into Montenegro U19 national squad, he signed a three-year deal with the club in spring 2016. He made his senior debut in 35 fixture match of 2015–16 Serbian SuperLiga season, against Partizan on 7 May 2016.

On 1 September 2017, he was loaned out to FK BSK Borča for the rest of the year.

Iskra Danilovgrad
In January 2019, Račić then joined FK Iskra Danilovgrad. He played only seven league games for the club, before he left one year later.

Mornar
Račić joined FK Mornar in January 2019.

Career statistics

Club

References

1998 births
Living people
People from Berane
Association football forwards
Montenegrin footballers
Montenegro youth international footballers
FK Voždovac players
FK BSK Borča players
FK Iskra Danilovgrad players
FK Mornar players
OFK Grbalj players
Serbian SuperLiga players
Montenegrin First League players
Montenegrin Second League players